Wallace Community College (WCC) (formally known as George C. Wallace State Community College) is a public community college in Dothan, Alabama. It is named after governor and outspoken segregationist George Wallace. It enrolls 3,958 students and has been accredited by the Commission on Colleges of the Southern Association of Colleges and Schools since 1969.  , the college has three campuses: the Wallace Campus and the Center for Economic and Workforce Development in Dothan, and the Sparks Campus in Eufaula.

Established in 1949, George C. Wallace Community College, with campuses in Dothan and Eufaula, is one of the largest and oldest community colleges in Alabama. It is part of the Alabama Community College System.

Athletics
WCC maintains a men's junior college baseball team affiliated with the Southern Conference and women's softball team.
Even though known as a men's junior college baseball school, back in 2001, the Wallace Community College Men's Basketball team won the AJCCC State Championship under coach Eddie Barnes and Assistant Coaches Philip M. Cassis and Tom Helmeyer. The team also made it to the NJCAA final four and finished third in the Nation.  The baseball team is currently coached by former Major League Baseball catcher Mackey Sasser.

References

External links
Official website

Community colleges in Alabama
Educational institutions established in 1947
Dothan, Alabama
Dothan metropolitan area, Alabama
Universities and colleges accredited by the Southern Association of Colleges and Schools
Education in Houston County, Alabama
Education in Barbour County, Alabama
Education in Dale County, Alabama
1947 establishments in Alabama
George Wallace